Laura Ashley Bell Bundy (born April 10, 1981) is an American actress and singer. She is best known for originating the Broadway roles of Amber Von Tussle in the musical version of Hairspray and Elle Woods in the musical version of Legally Blonde. She also portrayed Dr. Jordan Denby on the television show Anger Management. In 2010 she signed to Mercury Records Nashville and released her first two country music singles, "Giddy On Up" and "Drop on By".

Early life
Bell Bundy was born in Euclid, Ohio, and raised in Lexington, Kentucky. Her mother, Lorna Bundy-Jones (née Lorna Ann Bell), is a Lancome Beauty Advisor at Ulta, and her father, Don Bundy, is an electrical engineer. Her parents divorced in 1997 when she was 16 years old; both have since remarried. She took dance lessons at Town and Village School of Dance in Paris, Kentucky. When she was nine, she appeared in the Radio City Christmas Spectacular in New York City. She graduated from Lexington Catholic High School. She is the niece of Marcia Malone Bell, Miss Kentucky 1978 and 1979 Top Ten Miss America semifinalist. Bell Bundy was diagnosed with celiac disease when she was about 18 years old. In 1995, at the age of 14, Bell Bundy appeared in the film Jumanji, playing the younger version of Bonnie Hunt's character, Sarah Whittle.

Career

Stage
Bell Bundy originated the role of Tina Denmark in Ruthless! The Musical which opened Off-Broadway in 1992. For this role, she was nominated for a 1993 Drama Desk Award for Outstanding Actress in a Musical. In 2002, at the age of 21, she made her Broadway debut in the musical Hairspray, originating the role of Amber Von Tussle. Bell Bundy was next a Glinda standby for Kristin Chenoweth in Wicked. She starred as Sherrie Christian in the musical Rock of Ages in Los Angeles.

From 2007 to July 2008, she starred on Broadway in Legally Blonde: The Musical where she originated the lead role of Elle Woods, receiving her first Tony Award nomination for Best Leading Actress in a Musical.

Bell Bundy's theatre credits outside of New York City include the national tour of The Sound of Music with Marie Osmond and Gypsy with Betty Buckley and Deborah Gibson at the Paper Mill Playhouse in Millburn, New Jersey (1998).

Bell Bundy reprised the role of Elle Woods in the U.S. national tour of Legally Blonde: The Musical as a temporary replacement for the injured Becky Gulsvig, alongside Lauren Zakrin. Bell Bundy began her brief run on January 13, 2009, and ended on February 22, 2009. She would go on to play Elle again during the Nashville engagement of the national tour from June 23–28, 2009. However, she fractured her arm during the June 27, 2009 performance, finished the show, and was rushed to the hospital immediately after.

On September 27, 2008, she participated in a benefit concert for Anaheim, California's the Chance Theatre with fellow Wicked alum Eden Espinosa and with Spring Awakening alum Lea Michele for the Broadway Chance Style: Up Close and Personal concert.

On June 13, 2010, she was a presenter at the 64th Tony Awards ceremony.

She appeared as Trixie Norton in a new musical The Honeymooners, based on the television comedy The Honeymooners. The musical premiered at the Paper Mill Playhouse in Milburn, New Jersey on September 28, 2017, running through October 29. Directed by John Rando, the musical also starred Michael McGrath as Ralph Kramden, Michael Mastro as Ed Norton, and Leslie Kritzer as Alice Kramden.

Bundy appeared in the lead role of Sweet Charity staged and directed by Kathleen Marshall in June 2018 in Los Angeles. She has been cast to return to Broadway in the 2023 play The Cottage, which is scheduled to run at the Hayes Theater from July through October 2023.

Film and television
Bell Bundy has appeared in films including The Adventures of Huck Finn (1993), Life with Mikey (1993), and Jumanji (1995) as Young Sarah Whittle. She appeared in the 2006 film adaptation of Dreamgirls.

Bell Bundy was a judge at the Miss America 2009 pageant.

Bell Bundy had a recurring role on the sixth season of CBS's How I Met Your Mother as Becky, Robin's co-anchor. She would reprise the role in the spinoff, How I Met Your Father. Bell Bundy had a recurring role as Shelby on The CW's Hart of Dixie from 2012 until 2015.

She starred as Dr. Jordan Denby on the FX sitcom Anger Management in 2013.

In 2015, she starred in Becoming Santa, a Lifetime TV movie with Michael Gross and Meredith Baxter.

She currently stars as Rachel Raskin on The Fairly OddParents: Fairly Odder, a live action sequel series to The Fairly OddParents, which premiered March 31, 2022 on Paramount+.

Country music

Bell Bundy released her debut country music album, titled Longing For a Place Already Gone, in 2007.

After leaving Legally Blonde: The Musical in July 2008, she moved back to Nashville to work on her second album, Achin' and Shakin. Achin' and Shakin was released on April 13, 2010. It debuted at number 5 on the Billboard Top Country Albums chart as well as number 28 on the all-genre Billboard 200. As of June 26, 2010, the album has sold over 70,000 copies in the United States. It also charted internationally, where it reached number 34 on the Norwegian Albums Chart. Bell Bundy also appeared in fellow country artist Miranda Lambert's music video for "Only Prettier," as one of Lambert's friends alongside Kellie Pickler and Hillary Scott of Lady Antebellum. Bell Bundy began as the spokesperson for the Selected Chevrolet Dealers of Middle Tennessee in September 2011. Bell Bundy released a new single, "That's What Angels Do", in 2012.

In mid-2013, Bundy signed with Big Machine Records and released the single "Two Step", a duet with Colt Ford.

Director
In July 2017, Laura Bell Bundy co-directed Lexington Theatre Company production of Legally Blonde: The Musical at Lexington Opera House.
On November 12, 2017, she directed concert of Double Standards at The Town Hall.

In 2018, Laura Bell wrote and directed music videos for a Barefoot Wine campaign.

She also directed several sketches and music videos, includes parodies and covers of hit songs.

Podcasts
On October 5, 2020, she and music producer Shea Carter launched their podcast Women of Tomorrow, an extension their album of the same name that allows "Bundy and Carter to dive deep into [the issues of women's rights] that were so hard-fought.".

Bell Bundy has been a guest on many podcasts to promote the podcast and album, one of the most notable being The Theatre Podcast with Alan Seales.

Personal life
In December 2015, Bell Bundy announced her engagement to TBS executive Thom Hinkle after four years of dating. They were married on June 3, 2017, in Arcadia, California. On February 25, 2019 she announced that she was pregnant with her first child. Their son was born in May 2019.

In March 2020, Bell Bundy announced on social media that she had tested positive for COVID-19. She has since recovered.

Discography

Studio albums

Singles
{| class="wikitable plainrowheaders" style="text-align:center;"
|-
! rowspan="2"| Year
! rowspan="2" style="width:18em;"| Single
! colspan="4"| Peak chart positions
! rowspan="2"| Album
|- style="font-size:smaller;"
! style="width:45px;"| US Country
! style="width:45px;"| US Country Airplay
! style="width:45px;"| US Bubbling
! style="width:45px;"| US Dance
|-
| rowspan="2"| 2010
! scope="row"| "Giddy On Up"
| 31
| —
| 7
| 43
| style="text-align:left;" rowspan="2"| Achin' and Shakin'''
|-
! scope="row"| "Drop On By"
| 48
| —
| —
| —
|-
| 2012
! scope="row"| "That's What Angels Do"
| —
| —
| —
| —
| style="text-align:left;" rowspan="2"| Another Piece of Me|-
| 2013
! scope="row"| "Two Step"
| —
| 59
| —
| —
|-
| 2020
! scope="row"| "Get It Girl, You Go"(with Shoshana Bean and Anika Noni Rose)
| —
| —
| —
| —
| style="text-align:left;"| Women of Tomorrow|-
| colspan="7" style="font-size:8pt"| "—" denotes releases that did not chart
|}

Cast recordings and soundtracks
 Hairspray - Original Broadway Cast Recording (2003)
 Dreamgirls - Original Motion Picture Soundtrack (2006)
 Legally Blonde - Original Broadway Cast Recording (2008)
 Pure Country: Pure Heart - Original Motion Picture Soundtrack (2017)

Other recordings
 Featured on NEO: New, Emerging, Outstanding - "Any Day", duet with Kerry Butler, 2005
 Featured on New York Cares About Local Music - "Goodbye Yesterday", duet with Amber Rhodes, 2006
 Featured on Declaration of Independence - "Hugh Damn Right", duet with Colt Ford, 2012
 Featured on In the Spirit: A Celebration of the Holidays - "Baby, It's Cold Outside", with John Driskell Hopkins & Atlanta Pops Orchestra, 2015
 Featured on Saloons on Neptune - "Take a Shot", duet with Cowboy Troy, 2015

Music videos

Filmography
Film

Television

Theatre

Demo reading's 
 Blood DriveBut I'm a Cheerleader Hairspray''

Awards and nominations

References

External links
 
 
 
 

Actresses from Kentucky
American child actresses
American country singer-songwriters
American women country singers
American film actresses
American musical theatre actresses
American stage actresses
American television actresses
Big Machine Records artists
Lexington Catholic High School alumni
Living people
Actors from Lexington, Kentucky
Mercury Records artists
20th-century American actresses
21st-century American actresses
Musicians from Lexington, Kentucky
Country musicians from Kentucky
Singer-songwriters from Kentucky
Kentucky women musicians
Singers from Kentucky
1981 births